The Tenants is a 2009 Brazilian drama film directed by Sėrgio Bianchi. The film is featured in the Global Lens 2011 film series, sponsored by The Global Film Initiative.

Cast
Marat Descartes - Valter
Ana Carbatti - Iara
Umberto Magnani - Dimas

Awards
Festival Do Rio - Best Screenplay, Best Supporting Actress

References

External links
 

Brazilian drama films
2009 films
2000s Portuguese-language films